Edward "Eddie The Conductor" Sciandra (November 13, 1912 – July 13, 2003), was an Italian born member of the Mafia from Montedoro, Sicily.

Edward Sciandra was the former boss of the Bufalino crime family, and expanded their operations into Florida.

Sciandra was known to be an old-school man, especially with his work. He moved to Jamaica, Queens in the 1950s or 1960s. From there he moved to Pennsylvania and reunited with his cousin Bufalino.

He then began working with the Bufalino's sometime in the late 1960s and became a made man. Later, in 1980, he became the acting boss for Bufalino while he was imprisoned. After Sciandra the current boss William D'Elia took over.

Sciandra died on Long Island, New York on July 13, 2003.

References

1912 births
2003 deaths
Bufalino crime family
Italian emigrants to the United States
American gangsters of Italian descent
American gangsters of Sicilian descent